was a city located in Akita Prefecture, Japan.

On March 22, 2005, Honjō, along with the towns of Chōkai, Higashiyuri, Iwaki, Nishime, Ōuchi, Yashima and Yuri (all from Yuri District), merged to create the city of Yurihonjō.

In 2003, the city had an estimated population of 45,580 and the density of 242.05 persons per km². The total area was 188.31 km².

The city was founded on March 31, 1954.

External links
Yurihonjō official website 

Dissolved municipalities of Akita Prefecture
Yurihonjō